The Liberty Clipper is a replica sailing ship whose design was inspired by the Baltimore Clipper style of vessels which were predominant along the East Coast in the early 19th century.

She was designed by Charles Wittholz and built in 1983 at the Blount Shipyard in Rhode Island where she was first christened Mystic Clipper.  Though built of solid steel, with a 6-71 Detroit diesel motor as auxiliary propulsion, her rig and hull shape remain traditional.  She is currently operated as a charter vessel and sails out of Boston, MA.

References

Schooners of the United States
Baltimore Clipper
1983 ships
Ships built in Rhode Island